Florstadt is a town in the Wetteraukreis, in Hesse, Germany. It is located approximately 26 kilometers (16 miles) northeast of Frankfurt am Main. It received town privileges in 2007.

Rivers
The river Nidda and its tributary the Horloff flow through the area of the town.

Location
Florstadt borders on the town Reichelsheim in the north, on Ranstadt in the northeast, on Glauburg in the east, on Altenstadt and Niddatal in the south, and on Friedberg in the west.

Districts
The town is divided into six districts: Leidhecken, Nieder-Florstadt, Nieder-Mockstadt, Ober-Florstadt, Staden and Stammheim.

References

Wetteraukreis